Charleston, South Carolina, was a hotbed of secession at the start of the American Civil War and an important Atlantic Ocean port city for the fledgling Confederate States of America. The first shots against the Federal government were those fired there by cadets of the Citadel to stop a ship from resupplying the Federally held Fort Sumter.   Three months later, the bombardment of Fort Sumter triggered a massive call for Federal troops to put down the rebellion. Although the city and its surrounding fortifications were repeatedly targeted by the Union Army and Navy, Charleston did not fall to Federal forces until the last months of the war. Charleston was devastated.

Early war years

According to the 1860 Census, Charleston was the 22nd largest city in the United States, with a population of 40,522. As the 1814 burning of Washington had shown, America's coastal cities were vulnerable to a hostile fleet.  Along the Atlantic seaboard the young Republic began building a series of substantial forts. Fort Sumter is the most famous of these sited on a shoal in Charleston harbor.  There were also a series of smaller and older forts and bastions to protect it from any enemy ships.

Following the election of Abraham Lincoln, South Carolina convoked a special convention in Charleston to consider once more whether it made sense for South Carolina to remain in the Union.  her long dissatisfaction with the Federal government and many Northern citizens' views on slavery.  They believed that the avowed views of the new President-elect made abolition a likely goal of his administration. On December 20, 1860, the Secession Convention voted for South Carolina to secede from the Union. As the first state to do so, they also issued a Declaration of the Immediate Causes which explained her decision to part company from her erstwhile sister states.  Beginning with the Missouri Compromise in 1820, the defense of slavery, more than tariffs or states' rights, was the main factor contributing to sectionalism in South Carolina. The Secession Convention declared:

White southerners feared revolts by enslaved people. In 1860, half of South Carolina's population were enslaved black people.

Following its Secession from the Union in December, South Carolina militia seized Castle Pinckney and the Charleston Arsenal and their supplies of arms and ammunition.  On January 9, 1861, Citadel cadets fired upon the merchant ship Star of the West as it was entering Charleston's harbor. Local pride makes some call these the first shots of the Civil War.  The ship had been sent by the Buchanan administration with relief supplies of men and matérial for Fort Sumter's small garrison. As the new Confederate States of America came into being late that winter, old and abandoned forts were revamped around Charleston to focus upon the massive, though not completed, Federal fort.  Just as Lincoln was being inaugurated, the new President of the Confederacy, Jefferson Davis, appointed General Beauregard of Louisiana to take command of the virtual siege of the island fort.  Informed by the new Lincoln government that a supply ship, with food but no men or munitions, was to restock the fortress, President Davis, after consulting with his cabinet, on April 9 ordered the fort to be reduced before it was resupplied.

On April 12, at 3:20 AM, after a final effort to have the Union garrison surrender, Col. Robert Chestnut, CSA, notified Major Robert Anderson, USA that in one hour the batteries commanded by Brigadier General Pierre G. T. Beauregard would open fire.  Anderson, who had been a professor of Artillery at West Point, aware of the consequences of this, was deeply moved by the declaration.  As would happen many times again over the next four years, the embattled leaders knew each other well.  Beauregard, back at West Point, had been Anderson's assistant. After a 34-hour bombardment, Major Robert Anderson surrendered the fort.

Throughout much of the war, cadets from the Citadel, South Carolina's military institute, continued to aid the Confederate Army by helping to drill recruits, manufacture ammunition, protect arms depots, and guard Union prisoners. 

On December 11 of 1861, a massive fire burned 164 acres of the city, destroying the Cathedral of Saint John and Saint Finbar, the Circular Congregational Church and South Carolina Institute hall, and nearly 600 other buildings. Much of the damage remained un-repaired until the end of the war. Amos Gadsden, a former slave, recounted that it was started by a balloon while Union and Confederate troops were camped on opposite sides of the river.

In June 1862, a small but important battle at Secessionville,  modern-day James Island, South Carolina, resulted in Union forces being repulsed by a much smaller Confederate force.  The victory provided the city with a propaganda coup and saved it from the threat of land invasion.  Not until the latter stage of the war would the city be under such threat again.

Later war years

As many Southern port cities had been closed off by the Union blockade, Charleston became an important center for blockade running. Repeated attempts by the Union Navy to take Charleston and/or batter its defenses into the ground proved fruitless, including the Stone Fleet.  The city resisted military occupation for the majority of the war's four years.

In 1863, the Union began an offensive campaign against the defenses of Charleston Harbor, beginning with a combined sea-land engagement.  The naval bombardment accomplished little however, and the land forces were never put ashore.  By summer of 1863, the Union turned its attention to Battery Wagner on Morris Island, which guarded the harbor entrance from the southwest.  In the First and Second battles of Fort Wagner, Union forces suffered heavy losses in a failed attempt to capture the fort.  A siege however resulted in Confederate abandonment of Fort Wagner by September of that year.  An attempt to recapture Fort Sumter by a naval raiding party also failed badly, but Ft. Sumter was gradually reduced to rubble via bombardment from shore batteries, after the capture of Morris Island.

With the development of newer, longer-range artillery, and as Union forces were able to place batteries even closer to the city, the city was subjected to increasing bombardment. In November 1863, Jefferson Davis visited the city and noted it was better the city be reduced to "a heap of ruins" than surrender. The bombardment that began in late 1863 continued on and off for 587 days and destroyed much of the city that had survived the fire.  A coordinated series of attacks on the city were launched in early July 1864, including an amphibious assault on Fort Johnson and an invasion of Johns Island.  These attacks failed, but they continued to wear down the city's defenders.  The defenders were finally beaten back and the Union was able to capture the city, only a month and a half before the war ended.

Charleston Harbor was also the site of the first successful submarine attack in history on February 17, 1864, when the H.L. Hunley made a daring night attack on the USS Housatonic.  Although the Hunley survived the attack, she foundered and sank while returning from her mission, thus ending the threat to the Union blockade.

As Gen. Sherman marched through South Carolina, the situation for Charleston became ever more precarious. On February 15, 1865, Gen. Beauregard ordered the evacuation of remaining Confederate forces. On February 18, the mayor surrendered the city to General Alexander Schimmelfennig, and Union troops moved in, taking control of key sites. The first soldiers to enter the city were members of the 21st Infantry Regiment of the US Colored Troops and the 55th Massachusetts Infantry, another Black regiment, singing "John Brown's Body".

Union celebrations

The retaking of Charleston was the cause of celebration throughout the free states. The flag lowered at the surrender of Fort Sumter in 1861, at the outset of the Civil War, had been treated as an heirloom, housed in a specially-made case and exhibited at patriotic events to assist in fundraising. Now the same officer who had lowered it was sent to Charleston to raise it back up. Chartered boats brought hundreds of attendees from as far as New York. (Blacks were on a separate boat, with a Black captain.) Keynote speaker was America's most famous clergyman, Henry Ward Beecher, brother of Harriet Beecher Stowe. William Lloyd Garrison and many reporters also attended. The episode has been largely forgotten because that night, April 14, President Lincoln was assassinated.

Federal forces remained in Charleston during the city's reconstruction.

See also
Columbia, South Carolina, in the American Civil War
South Carolina in the American Civil War

Notes

References
 Cauthen, Charles Edward. South Carolina Goes to War 1860-1865. (1950) 
 Rosen, Robert 1997. A Short History of Charleston. University of South Carolina Press. .

South Carolina in the American Civil War
U.S. cities in the American Civil War
History of Charleston, South Carolina
19th-century in Charleston, South Carolina